The 1992 AT&T Challenge was a men's tennis tournament played on outdoor clay courts in Atlanta, Georgia, United States that was part of the World Series of the 1992 ATP Tour. It was the eighth edition of the tournament and was held from April 27 through May 3, 1992. Second-seeded Andre Agassi won the singles title.

Finals

Singles
 Andre Agassi defeated  Pete Sampras, 7–6(7–1), 6–2
 It was Agassi's 1st singles title of the year and 15th of his career.

Doubles
 Steve DeVries /  David Macpherson defeated  Mark Keil /  Dave Randall 6–3, 6–3

See also
 Agassi–Sampras rivalry

References

External links
 ITF tournament edition details

ATandT Challenge
Verizon Tennis Challenge
ATandT Challenge